Horeb is a hamlet in Carmarthenshire, Wales, near the town of Llanelli.
It is situated east of the village of Five Roads (Pum Heol) about five miles from Llanelli. The hamlet has one pub, the Waun Wyllt. It is situated in the River Lliedi valley (Cwm Lliedi), in which the river bearing the same name flows. Welsh is the dominant language.

Horeb is renowned for its limericks, one of which is:

There once was a town called HorebA place in hunger of fame.
But scared that they were too smallto be considered a jewelthey added the word "All" to the end of their name.... ... nobody came!

External links
Horeb Mill

Villages in Carmarthenshire
Llanelli